Tom Astor (born 27 February 1943) is a German singer and composer. He is noted for his extensive country and western recordings. He has worked with Johnny Cash, Kris Kristofferson, Dolly Parton, Kenny Rogers, John Denver, The Bellamy Brothers, Willie Nelson, Billy Ray Cyrus, George Jones, Wanda Jackson and Charlie McCoy among others.

Discography
Astor has recorded some 40 albums and around 600 songs. He has sold more than 4 million sound recordings.

Albums 
Grand Prix 1976
Asphalt Cowboy 1980
Hallo Trucker 1981
Country & Western Super Hits (Folge 1) 1983
Country & Western Super Hits (Folge 2) 1983
Westwind 1984
Hallo, guten Morgen Deutschland 1986
Trucker Weihnacht 1986
Lass rollen Trucker 1987
Hallo Freunde 1987
Eine kleine Dosis Freiheit 1988
International Airport
Fröhliche Trucker Weihnacht 1988
Meine schönsten Country & Trucker Songs 1989
Junger Adler 1990
Voll aus dem Leben 1991
Auf Achse 1991
Hallo Trucker 1991
Kapitäne der Landstraße 1992
Fröhliche Trucker Weihnacht 1992
Sturm und Drang 1993
Flieg junger Adler 1993
Ich bin wie ich bin 1994
Kameraden der Straße 1994
Meilensteine 1995
Tom Astor 1996
Das Beste ... Live 1997
...und ich bin dein Freund 1998
Hautnah 2000
Mein Eldorado 2003
Tom Astor Live 2004
Ich will mehr 2005
Lass es schnei’n 2005
Duette 2007 (with Johnny Cash, Kenny Rogers, Waylon Jennings, Billy Swan and Willie Nelson)
Alles klar – kein Problem! 2008
Tom Astor & Band unplugged live 2009
Leben pur 2010
Kinder Country Party 2012
Volle Kraft voraus 2014
Lieder zum Anfassen 2015
Ein Abend mit Tom Astor 2016

Singles 
 Hallo, guten Morgen Deutschland 1984 und 1990
 Freunde 1988
 Junger Adler 1990
 Ich bin kein Dichter- kein Poet 1991
 Take it easy nimm’s leicht 1991
 Flieg junger Adler 1993
 Kleiner Rebell 1994
 Hungrige Herzen 1994
 Irgendwie wird's schon geh´n 1996
 Eisen im Feuer 1997
 Ich bin dein Freund
 Mein Eldorado 2003
 Steh immer wieder auf 2005
 Wir werden nicht älter 2008
 Mit voller Kraft voraus 2014

Awards and honors 
 Goldene Stimmgabel 1994
 ZDF-Hitparade - Hit of the Year with Junger Adler, 1994
 Nomination „Global Artist Award“ 2007  - Country Music Association
 3 Gold records

References
Interview Tom Astor

External links

Official site

1943 births
Living people
German male singers
People from Hochsauerlandkreis